Matthey's mouse (Mus mattheyi) is a species of rodent in the family Muridae. Matthey's mouse was first described by Francis Petter (1923-2012) in 1969 and was named after Robert Matthey (1900-1982).

It is found in Burkina Faso, Ivory Coast, Ghana, Mali, Senegal, Togo, and possibly also in Benin, Guinea, and Guinea-Bissau.

Its natural habitat is moist savanna.

References

Mus (rodent)
Rodents of Africa
Mammals of West Africa
Matthey's mouse
Taxonomy articles created by Polbot